"Zamina mina (Zangaléwa)" was a hit song in 1986, by Cameroonian makossa's group Golden Sounds. Due to the song's popularity, the group changed its name to Zangaléwa following mainstream success. Most of the band members were in the Cameroonian Army during World War II.

Background

The languages present in the song's lyrics (Douala, French, Jamaican Patois, and the pidgin English of some parts of West Africa) make clear the song originates from the area of Cameroon, but the circumstances surrounding the time of the song's origin are less clear. Some sources indicate that the lyrics are a lament from the point of view of a single soldier. 

Other aspects of the song, including its frequent performances, have led to conflicting claims that the song is a tribute to African soldiers of World War II or a criticism of Africans who collaborated with European colonial authorities.

The song is still used today in Africa by soldiers, policemen, boy scouts, sportsmen, and their supporters, usually during training or for rallying. It is particularly popular in Cameroon, where it is used as a marching song or rallying cry.

The song was popularized in Colombia under the name "the Military" and "El sacalengua" ("The one who sticks out his tongue", due to the similarity to the phrase, " Saca la lengua" which means "stick out your tongue") by DJs fond of African music based in Barranquilla and Cartagena.

Cultural context

In the music video for the 1986 release, and in other performances of the song, performers often dress in military uniforms. The performers wear pith helmets and stuff their clothes to give the appearance of being well-off and associated with European colonial authorities. This appearance and the lyrics, according to some music historians, is a criticism of African military officers who were in league with the Europeans and profited from the oppression of their own people during the era of European imperialist colonization.

Some elements of the song incorporate Cameroonian slang and Cameroonian military jargon from World War II.

According to Jean Paul Zé Bella, the lead singer of Golden Sounds, the chorus came "from Cameroonian sharpshooters who had created a slang for better communication between them during the Second World War"; the band initially recreated the fast pace of the military communication in their first arrangements of the song.

Variants, covers, and sampling

The song became popular worldwide when the international pop star Shakira released a variant (as a tribute to African music) titled "Waka Waka (This Time For Africa)" in anticipation of the 2010 World Cup in South Africa.

Before "Waka Waka (This Time For Africa)" was released in 2010, the song was sampled or covered by other artists, including:

 Las Chicas Del Can – El negro no puede (1988)
 Beatmachine (Suriname) – Samina Mina
 Adane Best
 Los Condes
 Vic Nees
 Tom Pease in Daddy Starts To Dance! (1996)
 Trafassi (Suriname), El Negro No Puede (Waka Waka) (in the album "Tropicana (disc 1)" – 1997) 
 Blacks à braque and the Tambours majeurs from the album Les Hauts de Rouen percutent...
 Cape Town – Waka Waka
 Laughing Pizza in Pizza Party (2004)
  in Zamina (2006)
 Zaman in Zamina (2006)
 Didier Awadi – Zamouna from the album Sunugaal (2008)
Vampire Weekend – I'm Goin' Down (2010)
 Shakira, ft. Freshlyground - Waka Waka (This Time for Africa)
 BB DJ – Enfant Poli
 Mr. Tucker – Zamina Zamina Pele
 Massamba Diouf
 Selebobo – Zamina (2013)

References

External links 
  ("Waka Waka (This Time for Africa)" particularly covers the section of the song that starts roughly at the 7:30 mark in the video)

Cameroonian songs
1986 songs
Songs about Africa